This is a list of notable French breads, consisting of breads that originated in France.

 Baguette – a long, thin type of bread of French origin. The "baguette de tradition française" is made from wheat flour, water, yeast, and common salt. It may contain up to 2% broad bean flour, up to 0.5% soya flour, and up to 0.3% wheat malt flour.
 Boule de pain – a traditional shape of French bread resembling a squashed ball. It is traditionally prepared using only bread flour, salt, a leavening agent and water.
 Brioche – has a high egg and butter content, which gives it a rich, tender and tight crumb.
 Croissant – a buttery, flaky, French viennoiserie pastry inspired by the shape of the Austrian kipferl but using the French yeast-leavened laminated dough. Croissants are named for their historical crescent shape, the dough is layered with butter, rolled and folded several times in succession, then rolled into a thin sheet, in a technique called laminating. The process results in a layered, flaky texture, similar to a puff pastry.
 Faluche – a pale white bread that is a traditional bread in the  Nord-Pas-de-Calais region of northern France and the Tournai region of southern  Belgium.
 Ficelle – a type of French bread loaf, made with yeast and similar to a baguette but much thinner.
 Fougasse – typically associated with Provence but found (with variations) in other regions. Some versions are sculpted or slashed into a pattern resembling an ear of wheat.
 Pain aux noix – prepared using whole grain wheat flour and walnuts
 Pain brié – a traditional Normandy bread, its name comes from the pounding of the dough, as "brie" is derived from the Old Norman verb brier, meaning "to pound". It has a tight crumb and is a "fairly dense loaf".
 Pain complet – prepared using whole wheat flour, it is moist and has a tight crumb texture. It is sometimes prepard using a mix of wheat and white flour.
 Pain couronne – named "bread crown" in French for its shaping, it consists of small sourdough rolls that are torn off from the main loaf.
 Pain d’épices – French for "spice bread", this is a rye quick bread that includes spices such as cinnamon and honey.
 Pain de campagne – French for "country bread", and also called "French sourdough", it is typically a large round loaf (miche) made from either natural leavening or baker's yeast. Most traditional versions of this bread are made with a combination of white flour with whole wheat flour and/or rye flour, water, leavening and salt.
 Pain de mie – a white or brown bread with a thin, soft crust. It is used as a sandwich bread at times.
 Pain de seigle – a rye bread with flavor notes of chocolate and malt

See also

 Crackling bread – Pompe aux grattons or brioche aux griaudes, in the cuisine of central France, is a bread, tart, or brioche that incorporates cracklings. It is a specialty of the Bourbonnais.

 List of breads
 List of American breads
 List of British breads
 List of Indian breads
 List of Pakistani breads
 List of Uruguayan breads

References

Further reading
 
 
 

 
Lists of breads
Breads